Mieczysław Cygan (born 2 August 1921 in Koniuszki, died 7 April 2006 in Warsaw) - Polish military commander, Brigadier General of the Polish Army, military governor of Gdańsk (1982–1988), Secretary General of the Council for the Protection of Struggle and Martyrdom Sites (1989–1990).

Honours and awards
 Commander's Cross with Star of the Order of Polonia Restituta, previously awarded Commander's Cross, Officer's Cross and the Knight's Cross
 Order of the Banner of Work, first and second classes
 Order of the Grunwald Cross, 3rd class
 Gold Cross of Merit
 Silver Cross of Merit
 Medal of the 10th-Anniversary of People's Poland
 Medal of the 30th-Anniversary of People's Poland
 Medal of the 40th-Anniversary of People's Poland
 Medal for participation in the defensive war in 1939
 Medal of Warsaw 1939-1945
 Medal for Odra, Nysa, the Baltic
 Medal of Victory and Freedom 1945
 Gold Medal of the Armed Forces in the Service of the Fatherland
 Medal "For the Capture of Berlin"
 Gold Medal of Merit for National Defence
 Medal of the National Education Commission
 Badge of the 1000th anniversary of the Polish State
 Commander of the Order of Skanderbeg (Albania)
 Czechoslovak War Cross (Czechoslovakia) 1939
 Bronze Medal of the Brotherhood of Arms (German Democratic Republic)
 Order of the Patriotic War, 1st class (USSR)
 Medal "For the Liberation of Warsaw" (USSR)
 Medal "For the Victory over Germany in the Great Patriotic War 1941–1945" (USSR)
 Jubilee Medal "60 Years of the Armed Forces of the USSR"

1921 births
2006 deaths
People from Przemyśl County
Polish generals
Commanders with Star of the Order of Polonia Restituta
Recipients of the Order of the Banner of Work
Recipients of the Order of the Cross of Grunwald, 3rd class
Recipients of the Gold Cross of Merit (Poland)
Recipients of the Order of Skanderbeg (1925–45)
Recipients of the Czechoslovak War Cross
Polish deportees to Soviet Union